The GSLP–Liberal Alliance is a centre-left political alliance active in Gibraltar consisting of the Gibraltar Socialist Labour Party (GSLP) and Liberal Party of Gibraltar (LPG).

History
The first election contested by the Alliance was the 2000 general election in February 2000, in which the GSLP and LPG (the latter the direct successor of the Gibraltar National Party) won 7 seats in the House of Assembly, losing to the centre-right Gibraltar Social Democrats (GSD).

The following 2003 general election on 28 November 2003 was a defeat for the Alliance, again winning 7 seats, as was the 2007 general election on 11 October 2007.

The 2011 general election on 11 December 2011 was the first electoral  victory for the Alliance, winning 10 seats in the Gibraltar Parliament, forming the government for the first time, with GSLP leader Fabian Picardo serving as Chief Minister.

In the  2015 general election on 26 November 2015, the Alliance were returned as the government with 68% of the vote and 10 seats.

Election results

Parliament of Gibraltar

By-elections

See also
Lib–Lab pact

References

Political parties in Gibraltar
Coalition governments of the United Kingdom